The historic centre of Kryvyi Rih (also called Horod) is an area in the Tsentralno-Miskyi District of Kryvyi Rih, which was the core of the city's formation. It is located in the area of the former confluence of the Inhulets and Saksahan rivers, and has a linear and elongated block structure.

References 

History of Kryvyi Rih
Kryvyi Rih
Tourist attractions in Kryvyi Rih
Geography of Kryvyi Rih